Plynlimon, also spelled as Pumlumon in Welsh (also historically anglicised as Plinlimon and Plinlimmon), is the highest point of the Cambrian Mountains in Wales (taking a restricted definition of the Cambrian Mountains, excluding Snowdonia, the Berwyns and the Brecon Beacons), and the highest point in Mid Wales. It is a massif that dominates the surrounding countryside and is the highest point (county top) of Ceredigion (both the modern council area, and the historic county, also known as Cardiganshire).

Its other important peaks are Pen Pumlumon Arwystli, Y Garn, Pen Pumlumon Llygad-bychan and Pumlumon Fach. Bryn yr Ŵyn, or Hill of the Lambs, is a Dewey in the foothills.

The longest river in Britain, the River Severn, has its source on the mountain, as do the rivers Wye and Rheidol.

Folklore says there is a sleeping giant in Plynlimon.

Etymology
Plynlimon is anglicised from the Welsh name Pumlumon, which is thought to mean "five tops" or "five beacons".

Habitat
The Plynlimon area is the source of the rivers Wye, Severn and Rheidol.
Since 2007 the Wildlife Trusts of Wales have been working to improve the habitat as a "living landscape" project. This watershed area has been affected by loss of biodiversity, erosion of the peaty soils' structure, and accelerated drainage.

Like most of the uplands across Wales, intensive land use activities have resulted in many habitats being either lost or degraded. Over-grazing of sheep has induced soil compaction, which has resulted in increased flooding of the lowland areas. 
The principal land cover within the project area is dominated by a complex mosaic of locally, nationally and internationally important habitats and species, such as dry and wet dwarf-shrub heathland, blanket bog, unimproved acid grassland and a number of oligotrophic lakes. Agriculturally improved grassland, broadleaved woodlands and forestry plantation are also characteristic features of the area.

The Plynlimon area is also important for breeding, wintering and feeding bird fauna particularly hen harrier, merlin, short-eared owl and red and black grouse, and a number of Red Data Book and UK BAP invertebrates. The red kite also frequents the area. Golden plovers have declined by 92% since 1992.

Severn Way
The Severn Way runs for 210 miles (337 km) along the River Severn between the mouth of the Severn at Bristol, England, and its source at Plynlimon, Wales.

References

External links
 Computer generated summit panoramas Plynlimon index
THE PUMLUMON PROJECT, Montgomeryshire Wildlife Trust
 www.geograph.co.uk ; photos of Plynlimon and surrounding area

Mountains and hills of Ceredigion
Hewitts of Wales
Marilyns of Wales
Nuttalls
Elenydd
Sites of Special Scientific Interest in Ceredigion